Proto-celadon (Chinese: 灰釉陶, also 原始青瓷) was a type of Chinese ceramic which developed during the Shang and Jin periods. It is often described as "proto-porcelain", and was usually glazed in light yellowish green. 

The body of proto-celadon was high-fired, the Chinese classification including porcelain, with an iron content below 3%. Firing temperature was around 1200 degrees Celsius. In Western terms the wares are stoneware.  Surface treatment consisted of a lime glaze. The shapes manufactured in proto-celadon were similar to the objects manufactured in bronze.

Proto-celadon was mainly produced in the areas south of the Yangtze river. From the Han dynasty onward, production greatly improved in quantity and quality.

Inception of true celadon

From the Eastern Han period, true celadon ware (Chinese: 成熟青瓷) started to appear, with production focused in Zhejiang Province. Although still following the shapes and patterns of proto-celadon wares, these advances now represented the characteristics of porcelain, with refined clays and appropriate firing temperatures.

These advances were followed by those of Yue ware, and the blooming of celadon production from the period of the Song dynasty.

Notes

External links
A Handbook of Chinese Ceramics from The Metropolitan Museum of Art 

Chinese pottery